Álex Casasayas Carles (born 2 February 1988) is a Spanish field hockey player who plays for Belgian club Braxgata.

At the 2016 Summer Olympics, he competed for the national team in the men's tournament.

Casasayas played for Real Club de Polo in Spain until the 2018–19 season when he moved to Belgium to play for Braxgata.

References

External links

1988 births
Living people
Field hockey players from Barcelona
Spanish male field hockey players
2014 Men's Hockey World Cup players
Field hockey players at the 2016 Summer Olympics
Olympic field hockey players of Spain
Real Club de Polo de Barcelona players